Rama Kanta Dewri is a Bharatiya Janata Party politician from Assam. He has been elected in Assam Legislative Assembly election in 2016 from Marigaon constituency.

On 18 February 2017, a sex tape featuring Dewri went viral in the Marigaon constituency. Dewri denied involvement in the video and said he would resign if forensic tests showed his involvement.

References 

Living people
Bharatiya Janata Party politicians from Assam
Assam MLAs 2016–2021
People from Morigaon district
Year of birth missing (living people)
Assam MLAs 2021–2026